The South Africa women's national under-21 field hockey team represents South Africa in international field hockey matches and tournaments.

Tournament history

Junior World Cup

Junior Africa Hockey Cup
 1997 – 
 2001 – 
 2004 – 
 2008  – 
 2012 - 
 2016 - 
 2021 - Cancelled
 2023 –

FIH Hockey Junior World Cup Current squad

Junior Africa Hockey Cup Current squad
The squad was announced on 25 February 2023.

Head coach: Lenise Marais

Notes

References

Women's national under-21 field hockey teams
Field hockey
under-21 national team